Cyclops (translit. Tsiklopŭt) is a 1976 Bulgarian drama film directed by Khristo Khristov. It was entered into the 27th Berlin International Film Festival.

Cast
 Mikhail Mutafov - Edi, komandirŭt
 Nevena Kokanova - Zoya
 Penka Tsitselkova - Maria
 Nikola Dadov - Bashtata na Edi
 Penko Penkov - Pomoshtnik komandirŭt
 Pavel Poppandov - Starshinata akustik
 Ivan Yordanov
 Zinka Drumeva
 Virdzhiniya Kirova
 Kiran Kolarov
 Ognyan Gilinov

References

External links

1976 films
Bulgarian drama films
1970s Bulgarian-language films
1976 drama films
Films directed by Christo Christov